Nowy Targ County is a unit of territorial administration and local government (powiat) in Lesser Poland Voivodeship, southern Poland, on the Slovak border. It came into being on January 1, 1999, as a result of the Polish local government reforms passed in 1998.

As of 2006 its total population is 181,878, out of which the population of Nowy Targ is 33,493, that of Rabka-Zdrój is 13,031, that of Szczawnica is 7,334, and the rural population is 128,020.

Neighbouring counties
Nowy Targ County is bordered by Sucha County to the north-west, Myślenice County to the north, Limanowa County to the north-east, Nowy Sącz County to the east and Tatra County to the south. It also borders Slovakia to the south.

Administrative division
The county is subdivided into 14 gminas (two urban, one urban-rural and 11 rural). These are listed in the following table, in descending order of population.

References
Polish official population figures 2006

External links

 
Nowy Targ